The 2015 Eastern District Council election was held on 22 November 2015 to elect all 35 members to the Eastern District Council.

The most surprising result was Chui Chi-kin, an "umbrella soldier" inspired by the 2014 Hong Kong protests almost unknown to the public before he was elected, beat DAB legislator Christopher Chung Shu-kun with 2,017 votes against Chung's 1,829 votes in Yue Wan.

Overall election results
Before election:

Change in composition:

References

2015 Hong Kong local elections